Maranda may refer to: 

A city in the video game Final Fantasy VI
Maranda, India
Maranda, Zimbabwe
Falconar AMF-14H Maranda, Canadian amateur-built aircraft
Falconar AMF-S14 Super Maranda, Canadian amateur-built aircraft

People with the surname
Kazimierz Maranda (born 1947), Polish middle-distance runner

See also
Miranda (disambiguation)